Lesueur's goby (Lesueurigobius suerii) is a species of goby native to the Eastern Atlantic Ocean near the coasts of the Canary Islands and Morocco as well as in the Mediterranean Sea. This species can reach a length of  TL. This species can also be found in the aquarium trade The specific name honours the French naturalist Charles Alexandre Lesueur (1778-1846).

References

Lesueur's goby
Fauna of the Canary Islands
Fauna of Morocco
Fish of the Mediterranean Sea
Lesueur's goby